Iceal E. "Gene" Hambleton (November 16, 1918 – September 19, 2004) was a United States Air Force navigator who was shot down over South Vietnam during the 1972 Easter Offensive. He was aboard an EB-66 aircraft whose call sign was Bat 21. As the ranking navigator/EWO on the aircraft, he was seated immediately behind the pilot, giving him the call sign "Bat 21 Bravo". He survived for  days behind enemy lines until he was retrieved in a ground operation. His rescue was the longest and most costly search and rescue mission during the Vietnam War. He received the Silver Star, the Distinguished Flying Cross, the Air Medal, the Meritorious Service Medal and a Purple Heart during his career.

Military career
Hambleton served in the United States Army Air Forces during the last years of World War II without seeing any combat. Released from active duty at the end of the war, he retained a Reserve commission and was recalled back to active duty by the United States Air Force (USAF) during the 1950s. During the Korean War, he flew 43 sorties as navigator in a B-29 Superfortress. He then worked during the 1960s on various USAF ballistic missile projects such as the PGM-19 Jupiter, Titan I ICBM and Titan II ICBM. From 1965 to 1971, he commanded the 571st Strategic Missile Squadron at Davis-Monthan Air Force Base in Tucson, Arizona, and was also the deputy chief of operations for his squadron's parent unit, the Strategic Air Command's 390th Strategic Missile Wing at Davis-Monthan AFB.

Vietnam War
Hambleton switched from the Strategic Air Command to Seventh Air Force and was assigned to the 42nd Tactical Electronic Warfare Squadron (42 TEWS) in Korat, Thailand as a navigator. The 42 TEWS was equipped with EB-66C/E Destroyer aircraft that flew radar and communications jamming missions to disrupt enemy defenses and early warning capabilities.

On his 63rd mission, on April 2, 1972, Hambleton was a navigator aboard an EB-66C gathering signals intelligence, including identifying enemy anti-aircraft radar installations, to enable jamming. The aircraft was helping escort a cell of three B-52 bombers tasked with attacking entrance passes to the Ho Chi Minh trail. Hambleton was the only one of the three-man crew able to eject. He parachuted into the middle of the North Vietnamese Easter Offensive and landed in the midst of tens of thousands of North Vietnamese soldiers. His eventual rescue from behind enemy lines was the "largest, longest, and most complex search-and-rescue" operation during the entire Vietnam War.

Hambleton had received water survival training at Homestead Air Force Base, Florida, and escape and evasion training and survival basics at the Pacific Air Command Jungle Survival School in the Philippines. During the rescue operation, five aircraft were shot down, 11 airmen were killed in action, and 2 were captured. Nine additional aircraft and helicopters were badly damaged during the rescue attempts. General Creighton Abrams finally ordered that no further air rescue operations should be attempted, but ordered a ground rescue operation. Hambleton was a USAF ballistic missile expert with a Top Secret/SCI clearance and his capture by the North Vietnamese Army would have been of tremendous benefit to them and the Soviet Union. Hambleton said after the war that he felt sure if he were captured that he would never have been taken to Hanoi.

Hambleton was finally rescued after  days by Navy SEAL Lieutenant Thomas R. Norris and VNN commando Nguyen Van Kiet in a covert, night-time infiltration  behind enemy lines. Norris was awarded the Medal of Honor and Nguyen the Navy Cross. Nguyen was the only South Vietnamese naval officer given that award during the war.

Hambleton was awarded the Silver Star, the Distinguished Flying Cross, the Air Medal, the Meritorious Service Medal and a Purple Heart during his career.

Death
Hambleton died on September 19, 2004, in Tucson, Arizona, at age 85. The cause of death was pneumonia related to lung cancer, according to a family member. He was interred in Abraham Lincoln National Cemetery, Elwood, Illinois.

In popular media
The story of Hambleton's evasion and rescue was told in the 1980 book, Bat 21, written  by Air Force Colonel William Charles Anderson. This was followed by the dramatic 1988 film, Bat*21, starring Gene Hackman as Hambleton and Danny Glover as a forward air controller. A second book, The Rescue of Bat 21, based on a large amount of declassified information, was written by Col. Darrel D. Whitcomb and published in 1998. Whitcomb was a decorated pilot and from 1972 to 1974 a forward air controller based in Southeast Asia.

References

External links
 King Hawes – A Tale of Two Airplanes
 

1918 births
2004 deaths
Recipients of the Silver Star
Recipients of the Distinguished Flying Cross (United States)
People from Vermilion County, Illinois
United States Air Force colonels
United States Army Air Forces personnel of World War II
United States Air Force personnel of the Vietnam War
United States Air Force personnel of the Korean War
United States Army Air Forces officers
Recipients of the Air Medal
Recipients of the Meritorious Service Decoration
Shot-down aviators
Burials at Abraham Lincoln National Cemetery
Military personnel from Illinois